Charles Pound Woods (12 September 1878 – 1 July 1940) was an English cricketer. Woods was a right-handed batsman. He was born in Swinton, Lancashire.

Woods made his debut for Cheshire in the 1910 Minor Counties Championship against Northumberland. He played Minor counties cricket for the county from 1910 to 1912, making six appearances. Almost twenty years later at the age of 51, he played a single first-class match for Wales against the Minor Counties in 1930. In Wales first-innings he was dismissed for 5 runs by Ernest Dynes, while in their second-innings he was dismissed for 4 runs by the same bowler.

He died in Llandudno, Caernarvonshire, Wales on 1 July 1940.

References

External links
Charles Woods ESPNcricinfo
Charles Woods at CricketArchive

1878 births
1940 deaths
People from Swinton, Greater Manchester
English cricketers
Cheshire cricketers
Wales cricketers